Dave Frankel was a television weatherman and news anchor in Philadelphia before leaving the air to become an attorney. He joined WPVI-TV 6-ABC in 1984 as an investigative reporter. He became the morning weatherman in 1989. Dave was a prominent and popular personality at the station. In 1997 he moved onto KYW-TV CBS-3 where he anchored the 6pm news with the late Siani Lee.  Dave was also a freelance reporter for ESPN.  He graduated from Dartmouth College and cum laude from Villanova University School of Law.

After a stint as a practicing entertainment lawyer with Montgomery, McCracken, Walker & Rhoads in Philadelphia, representing broadcast journalists, Frankel opened his own law office, Frankel and Kershenbaum, in June 2009.

External links
Dave Frankel's Facebook Page
Dave Frankel's LinkedIn Page
Recent article on Dave Frankel

Dartmouth College alumni
Villanova University School of Law alumni
American television journalists
Television anchors from Philadelphia
Weather presenters
American lawyers
Jewish American journalists
Year of birth missing (living people)
Living people
American male journalists
21st-century American Jews